The Try Street Terminal  (now "Terminal 21 Apartments", a luxury loft-style apartment building)  in the Central Business District of Pittsburgh, Pennsylvania, is former 1921 freight terminal and warehouse designed in the "commercial utilitarian" style. It was listed on the National Register of Historic Places in 2007.

In 2011, the building and its streetscape were featured in the music video Black and Yellow.

References

Residential buildings on the National Register of Historic Places in Pennsylvania
Residential buildings in Pittsburgh
Industrial buildings completed in 1921
Industrial buildings and structures on the National Register of Historic Places in Pennsylvania
National Register of Historic Places in Pittsburgh
1921 establishments in Pennsylvania
Industrial buildings and structures in Pittsburgh